The Meanest Gal in Town is a 1934 American Pre-Code romantic comedy, directed by Russell Mack from a screenplay written by Richard Schayer, Russell Mack, and H. W. Hanemann, and starring Zasu Pitts, El Brendel, Pert Kelton, and James Gleason.

Cast
Zasu Pitts as Tillie Prescott
Pert Kelton as Lulu White
El Brendel as Chris Peterson
James Gleason as Duke Slater
Richard "Skeets" Gallagher as Jack Hayden (credited as "Skeets" Gallagher)
Edward McWade as Clark - Tillie's Clerk
John Carradine as Stranded Actor (uncredited)
Wallis Clark as Mr. Bowen - Barbershop Customer (uncredited)
Bud Geary as Loafer (uncredited)
Frank Hagney as Angry Truck Driver (uncredited)
Harry Holman as Brookville's Mayor (uncredited)
DeWitt Jennings as Police Chief (uncredited)
Lew Kelly as Man with Poster in Barbershop (uncredited)
Vera Lewis as Woman at Mayor's Outing (uncredited)
Bob McKenzie as Kingston Hotel Owner (uncredited)
Florence Roberts as Mom - Old Stranded Actress (uncredited)
Harry Semels as Handcar Driver with Lulu (uncredited)
Morgan Wallace as Sydney Sterling (uncredited)

References

External links 

 

1934 films
1934 romantic comedy films
American romantic comedy films
Films directed by Russell Mack
American black-and-white films
1930s American films
Films with screenplays by Richard Schayer